Maximilian Siebald (born 12 January 1993) is a German footballer who plays as a midfielder for FC Ismaning.

Career
Siebald made his professional debut for SpVgg Unterhaching in the 3. Liga on 27 April 2013, coming on as a substitute in the 81st minute for Marius Willsch in the 1–3 away loss against Wacker Burghausen.

References

External links
 Profile at DFB.de
 Profile at kicker.de
 FC Ismaning statistics 2014–15 season at BFV.de
 FC Ismaning statistics 2015–16 season at BFV.de

1993 births
Living people
Footballers from Munich
German footballers
Association football midfielders
SpVgg Unterhaching II players
SpVgg Unterhaching players
3. Liga players